Puff the Magic Dragon is a 30-minute animated television special based on the song of the same name made notable by Peter, Paul and Mary. First aired October 30, 1978 on CBS, and produced by Fred Wolf Films, it features Burgess Meredith as the voice the title character.

The special was followed by two sequels: Puff the Magic Dragon in the Land of the Living Lies (1979) and Puff and the Incredible Mr. Nobody (1982).

Plot
The film begins with Puff's narration about a little boy named Jackie Draper, who is filled with so much self-doubt and fear that he has stopped talking altogether. His parents are so concerned that they have three doctors examine him, and they say it is hopeless and that little Jackie will never talk again. Jackie returns to his room, where he sits until Puff comes to his bedroom window and starts a conversation with him.

Puff invites himself in, talks to Jackie about inner happiness, and pulls a long sheet of paper out of a magic bag. He cuts the paper into a paper doll shaped like Jackie and dubs it Jackie Paper. He explains that Jackie Paper can do anything and then asks if he can put his happiness into it. After he does so, the paper doll version of Jackie comes to life, and Puff then begins to make plans to go to Honalee, which is located by the sea. Jackie admits he is afraid. Puff then helps Jackie make a boat using things in Jackie's room, such as string, sealing wax, and the frame of his bed.

They set out onto the ocean, where they meet a boat filled with kings and princes in the shape of cards. Afterward, Jackie says he was afraid of pirates after hearing about them. They then run into Very Long John Black and Bluebeard Kidd, a giant pirate who takes them to his island. While they await their fate, Puff says that Very Long John will not be scary if they get to know him. They then view his inner desire with Puff's magic smoke rings which have the power to reveal hidden things. It reveals that Very Long John secretly wishes to be a baker. Jackie challenges (with a verse from Billy Boy) Very Long John to bake a cherry pie, which he does, and subsequently expresses that he always wanted to be a baker, but never believed he could do it and was afraid he could not change from being a pirate. Jackie prompts him to make this change, and Very Long John expresses his gratitude to Jackie and Puff.

They continue their journey until they reach the starless sky, where jealous clouds block out the brightness of the stars. One of the stars falls, and Puff instructs Jackie to take the small star to the sky with the boat, which Puff gives butterfly wings. In order for the ship to fly, Puff has to get out of the boat, leaving Jackie alone to face his fears. Jackie then returns the star to the sky, brightening the sky. Puff rewards Jackie with a medal for bravery.

Eventually they reach Honalee, which, instead of a paradise, turns out to be a gloomy place. This is revealed to be the work of living sneezes that out of depression made the place gloomy to fit their mood. Puff then orders Jackie to leave, as this is no place for him. After that Puff sadly walks to his cave, realizing he was not brave enough to defeat the sneezes. He is then reunited with Jackie, who returns with Very Long John and his chicken soup to cure the living sneezes of their colds, making them happy. They then return Honalee to its happy glory by singing.

Once this is done, Puff and Jackie go back to Jackie's room and return Jackie to his body. Puff tells Jackie that thanks to his creativity he is now a brave boy and leaves, saying he will return to visit. Jackie's parents come into the room to find Jackie happy and talking again. They then hug Jackie and express their love for him. The film ends with Puff asking the audience if they just saw a dragon walk by, similar to what he asked Jackie at the beginning of the story.

Voice cast
 Burgess Meredith as Puff
 Philip Tanzini as Jackie
 Peter Yarrow as Father
 Maitzi Morgan as Mother/Star
 Robert Ridgely as Pirate/Pieman/Sneeze
 Regis Cordic as Bald Doctor
 Frank Nelson as Tall Doctor
 Charles Woolf as Short Doctor

Other Media
In September 1979, there was a picture book version of the short that used pictures based on the animated feature. It was published by Avon Books and dedicated to Peter, Paul, and Mary. The book featured words and sheet music to several songs that were featured in the short at the back of the book. This included "The Boat Song" and "Weave Me the Sunshine". The book also used the use of the original song throughout the book as the short had.

The head of Puff can also be seen on the green dragon in the music video for "Weird Al" Yankovic's song "Another Tattoo".

References

External links

1978 television specials
1970s American television specials
Animated television specials
CBS television specials
English-language television shows
Animated films about dragons
Television shows written by Romeo Muller
1970s animated television specials
American children's animated fantasy films
1970s American films